Rhododendron cuneatum (楔叶杜鹃) is a rhododendron species native to northern and western Yunnan and southwestern Sichuan in China, where it grows at altitudes of . It is an erect evergreen shrub that grows  in height, with leaves that are narrowly to broadly elliptic or oblong-lanceolate, 1–7 × 0.5–2.8 cm in size. The flowers are usually a deep rose colour.

References

 W. W. Smith 1914. Notes Roy. Bot. Gard. Edinburgh. 8(38): 200-201

cuneatum